Freebird Airlines is a Turkish charter airline based in Florya, Bakirköy, Istanbul. Its main base is Antalya Airport.

History 
The airline was established in June 2000 and started operations on 5 April 2001 with a service between Istanbul and Lyon using a McDonnell Douglas MD-83 aircraft. In November 2003 the airline received its first Airbus A320-200 aircraft, and today the fleet is made up entirely of this type.

Destinations

As of March 2023, Freebird Airlines operates regularly to the following destinations.

Fleet 

As of November 2019, the fleet consists of the following aircraft. Every aircraft features a different coloured tail.

See also
List of airlines of Turkey
List of charter airlines

References

External links

Turkish brands
Airlines established in 2000
Charter airlines of Turkey
Turkish companies established in 2000
Companies based in Istanbul